The Torneo Cuadrangular was a Uruguayan football tournament organized by the Uruguayan Football Association from 1952 to 1968.

The best four teams of each Uruguayan Primera División qualified to play the Torneo Cuadrangular, according to their placements in the final positions of each tournament.

List of champions

Titles by club

References

H
Recurring sporting events established in 1952
1952 establishments in Uruguay